Helmut Brasch (1912–1987) was a German film, television actor and cabaret singer.

In 1945 he sang Child of the Ruins, which describes some facets of Berlin society. He played S.S. Man Scharf in Divina-Film Nachts, wenn der Teufel kam (1957), by Robert Siodmak. He played mayor along Rolf Becker and Hannes Fuchs in Ich liebe dich, ich töte dich (1971).

Selected filmography

 Maria, die Magd (1936) - Johann
 Heimweh (1937) - Ein Fischer
 Wie einst im Mai (1938) - Tankstellenwart
 Der letzte Appell (1939)
 Das Lied der Wüste (1939) - Sam
 The Girl from Fano (1941) - Klaus
 Fritz and Friederike (1952) 
 Rose Bernd (1957)
 Weißer Holunder (1957) - Ferdinand
 The Devil Strikes at Night (1957) - SS-Truppenfuehrer Scharf
 Der Pauker (1958) - Detective
  (1959)
 Heiße Ware (1959) - Gessner
 People in the Net (1959) - Grasdorffer
 Beloved Augustin (1960) - Steuereinnehmer
 Les honneurs de la guerre (1961) - Müller
 Snow White and the Seven Jugglers (1962) - Dompteur Toni
 A Man in His Prime (1964)
 Go for It, Baby (1968) - Viktor Block
  (1968) - Dr. Meyer
 Erotik im Beruf - Was jeder Personalchef gern verschweigt (1971) - Direktor Wieland
 Ich liebe dich, ich töte dich (1971) - Mayor
 Bleib sauber, Liebling (1971)
 Sex in the Office (1972)
 Hausfrauen-Report 3.Teil - Alle Jahre wieder-wenn aus blutjungen Mädchen blutjunge Hausfrauen werden (1972) - Vertreter von Aphrodisiaka
 Was wissen Sie von Titipu? (1972) - Trainer
 Schulmädchen-Report 5. Teil - Was Eltern wirklich wissen sollten (1973) - Opa Kessler (uncredited)
 Cipolla Colt (1975) - Judge Logan
  (1975) - Man (uncredited)
  (1975) - Verleger Bergmann
  (1976)
  (1976) - Lerouge
 Rosemary's Daughter (1976) - Dr. Schreier
 The Tin Drum (1979) - Der alte Heilandt 
 Warten bis Lili kommt (1982) - Opa

References

Bibliography
 Pitts, Michael R. Western Movies: A Guide to 5,105 Feature Films. McFarland, 2012.

External links

1912 births
1987 deaths
Male actors from Berlin
German male television actors
German male film actors